The  is an incomplete expressway that exists in multiple segments in Miyagi Prefecture and Iwate Prefecture, Japan. The expressway connects Sendai, the capital and largest city in Miyagi Prefecture, to Miyako in Iwate Prefecture. It follows the coast of the Pacific Ocean in the northern parts of the Tōhoku region, otherwise known as the Sanriku Coast. It is owned and operated by East Nippon Expressway Company (NEXCO East Japan), the Miyagi Prefecture Road Corporation, and the Ministry of Land, Infrastructure, Transport and Tourism (MLIT). The route is signed as an auxiliary route of National Route 45 as well as E6 and E45 under MLIT's  "2016 Proposal for Realization of Expressway Numbering." It is one of three routes numbered E45, the other two are the Sanriku-kita Jūkan Road and the Hachinohe-Kuji Expressway, and one of many routes numbered E6, although the Sanriku Expressway only carries the number close to its southern terminus in Sendai. When completed, all of these routes will form an expressway that travels from the Tokyo Gaikan Expressway in Saitama Prefecture along the Pacific Coast to Hachinohe in Aomori Prefecture.

Naming
The expressway is named after the Sanriku region of northern Japan. The region was named Sanriku in the aftermath of the Boshin War, the provinces of Mutsu and Dewa were divided. Mutsu was split into new five provinces: Rikuō (also read Mutsu), Rikuchū, Rikuzen, Iwashiro and Iwaki.  The first three of these collectively known as the "Three Riku", or Sanriku, with san (三) meaning "three." They are now known, respectively, as Aomori Prefecture, Iwate Prefecture, and Miyagi Prefecture. When completed the Sanriku Expressway and Sanriku-kita Jūkan Road will span these three prefectures.

Future
The expressway is expected to be entirely completed by 2020 as part of a region-wide recovery effort from the 2011 Tōhoku earthquake and tsunami.

Junction list
TB= Toll booth, PA= Parking Area

|colspan="8" style="text-align: center;"|

|colspan="8" style="text-align: center;"|

See also

Joban Expressway
Japan National Route 45

References

External links
 Ministry of Land, Infrastructure and Transport: Tohoku Regional Development Bureau
 East Nippon Expressway Company

Roads in Miyagi Prefecture
Roads in Iwate Prefecture
Expressways in Japan
1982 establishments in Japan